Hanna Herbst (born 1990 Mainz) is a German journalist and author.

Life 
Herbst was born in Mainz, and moved to Salzburg in 1998. 
From 2008, she studied Political Science in Vienna.
From September 2015, she was Deputy Editor-in-Chief of Vice Austria.
In 2016, Forbes named her as one of 30 people in Austria under 30.

Works 

 Feministin sagt man nicht. Wien: Christian Brandstätter Verlag 2018.

References

External links 

 Hanna Herbst
Hanna Herbst Interview >> Elevate Festival 2016 in Elevate Festival 2016 - Interviews

Living people
German women journalists
21st-century German journalists
21st-century German women writers
1990 births
Writers from Mainz